Nálepkovo, formerly Vondrišel is a village and municipality in the Gelnica District in the Košice Region of eastern Slovakia. Total municipality population was in 2011  inhabitants. Previously, the village was named Vondrišel, but in 1948 after the German population was expelled it was renamed Nálepkovo, after the anti-fascist Slovak captain Ján Nálepka.

Nálepkovo is also the birthplace of the Queen's Park killer Marek Harcar who carried out the brutal murder of Moira Jones in 2008 in Glasgow, Scotland. He fled back to Nálepkovo after the incident but was linked to the crime, traced and returned to Scotland. He is now serving a life sentence after being tried and found guilty in 2009; in 2018 it was revealed that Harcar had been transferred to a Slovakian prison.

References

External links
Touristic page of Nálepkovo 
Official homepage 
http://en.e-obce.sk/obec/nalepkovo/nalepkovo.html

Villages and municipalities in Gelnica District
Romani communities in Slovakia